Robert Thorpe (died 15 May 1591) was an English Roman Catholic priest. He is a Catholic martyr, beatified in 1987.

Life

Thorpe was born in Yorkshire.  He reached the English College at Reims 1 March 1584, was ordained deacon in December following, and priest by Cardinal Louis de Guise in April 1585. He was sent on the English mission, 9 May 1585.

He was active in Yorkshire. He was arrested in bed very early on Palm Sunday, 1595, at the house of Thomas Watkinson, at Menthorpe in East Yorkshire. Someone had seen palms being gathered the night before, and informed John Gates of Howden, the nearest justice of the peace.

Watkinson, an old Catholic yeoman who lived a solitary life, is described by John Cecil as a clerk, so it is possible he was in minor orders. Thorpe was condemned as a traitor for being a Catholic priest, and was hanged, drawn, and quartered at York. Watkinson, condemned as a felon for harbouring priests, was hanged, despite having been offered his life if he would go to church.

See also
 Douai Martyrs

References

Attribution
 The entry cites:
Richard Challoner, Missionary Priests, I, no. 86;
John Hungerford Pollen, English Martyrs, 1584–1603 (London, 1908), 200–2; 
Thomas Francis Knox, Douay Diaries (London, 1878), passim.

1591 deaths
16th-century English Roman Catholic priests
English beatified people
People executed under Elizabeth I by hanging, drawing and quartering
16th-century venerated Christians
Year of birth unknown
Clergy from Yorkshire
Executed English people
Eighty-five martyrs of England and Wales